The Franklin W. Farrer House in southeast Portland in the U.S. state of Oregon is a two-story dwelling listed on the National Register of Historic Places. An American Craftsman structure built in 1914, it was added to the register in 1989. 

The interior of the house, originally a single-family dwelling, has been converted to two apartments, one on each floor. The house is locally unusual in its use of cast stone as a homebuilding material. Other notable features include elements of Prairie School architecture such as a low-pitched gable roof, an offset main entrance, exaggerated eave overhangs, and a strong emphasis on horizontal lines.

Farrer was the original owner. Born in 1867 in Minnesota, he moved in infancy to Damascus, Oregon, with his parents. In 1902, he began work for the United States Post Office Department in Portland, for which he delivered mail for 30 years. He occupied the house until his death in 1961.

See also
 National Register of Historic Places listings in Southeast Portland, Oregon

References

1914 establishments in Oregon
American Craftsman architecture in Oregon
Buckman, Portland, Oregon
Houses completed in 1914
Houses on the National Register of Historic Places in Portland, Oregon
Portland Eastside MPS
Portland Historic Landmarks